There are at least 13 named trails in Big Horn County, Wyoming according to the U.S. Geological Survey, Board of Geographic Names.  A trail is defined as: "Route for passage from one point to another; does not include roads or highways (jeep trail, path, ski trail)."
 Adelaide Trail, el.  
 Bench Trail, el.  
 Burnt Trail, el.  
 Cliff Lake Trail, el.  
 Dry Horse Trail, el.  
 Edelman Trail, el.  
 Elkhorn Trail, el.  
 Kinky White Trail, el.  
 Main Paint Rock Trail, el.  
 Mistymoon Trail, el.  
 North High Park Trail, el.  
 Solitude Trail, el.

See also
 List of trails in Wyoming

Notes

Geography of Big Horn County, Wyoming
Historic trails and roads in Wyoming